The following is a partial list of goalscorers in All-Ireland Senior Hurling Championship finals. See List of FIFA World Cup final goalscorers a similar list but in soccer not hurling.

Scoring in Gaelic games: Most scores are points but there are goals too.

For a team to score more than three goals in a final is a rarity, occurring in 2000 and 2010. When Lar Corbett (for Tipp, 2010) scored a hat-trick, only Eddie O'Brien (for Cork, 1970) had done it in a final. But the 2013 replay had Clare scoring five goals, including a Shane O'Donnell hat-trick.

The last final to finish goalless was in 2020.

Finals goalscorers

Pre-1921

1921 to 1996: Introduction of the Liam MacCarthy Cup

1997 to present

Goalless finals

1999

2004

2020

Goalscoring goalkeepers

John Commins (1) 1986

Anthony Nash (2) 2013 (draw), 2013 (replay)

Men with multiple goals

They include:

References

External links

Finals goalscorers
Hurling-related lists